North Woods or Northwoods may refer to:

 Laurentian Mixed Forest Province, a forested ecoregion in the United States and Canada also known as the North Woods.
 Operation Northwoods, a proposed operation against the Cuban government that originated within the Department of Defense and the Joint Chiefs of Staff of the United States government in 1962.
 Northwoods (forest), the boreal forest of North America.
 North Woods and North Meadow in Central Park, Manhattan, New York, United States